The Journal of the Academy of Marketing Science is a peer-reviewed academic journal about marketing. 

According to the Journal Citation Reports, the journal has a 2021 impact factor of  14.904 Since June 2018, the editor-in-chief is John Hulland (Terry College of Business). In 2010, the journal changed publication frequency from quarterly to bimonthly.

Previous editors 
The following persons have been editors-in-chief of the journal:

References

External links 
 

Business and management journals
Publications established in 1973
Bimonthly journals
English-language journals
Springer Science+Business Media academic journals